WYWY (950 AM) is a radio station licensed to Barbourville, Kentucky, United States.

References

External links
 
 

YWY
Radio stations established in 1967
1967 establishments in Kentucky
Barbourville, Kentucky